Fareeda Bibi is a Pakistani politician who is member of the Provincial Assembly of Balochistan.

Political career
She was elected to the Provincial Assembly of Balochistan as a candidate of Pakistan Tehreek-e-Insaf on a reserved seat for women in the 2018 Pakistani general election.

References

Living people
Pakistan Tehreek-e-Insaf MPAs (Balochistan)
Year of birth missing (living people)